Artur "Atze" Brauner (born Abraham Brauner; 1 August 1918 – 7 July 2019) was a German film producer and entrepreneur of Polish origin. He produced more than 300 films from 1946.

Life and career 
He was born the oldest son of a Jewish family in Łódź, Poland. His father was a timber wholesaler. Brauner attended a general education liceum in Łódź, where he took the matura final exam, and then studied at a local polytechnic technical school until the German attack on Poland in September 1939. With his parents and four siblings, he fled to the Soviet Union and survived the Holocaust. Following the war, he and his brother, Wolf Brauner emigrated to Berlin; his parents and three of his siblings emigrated to Israel. Twelve of his relatives were killed at Babi Yar, among forty-nine who died at the hands of the Nazis.

Brauner married Theresa Albert, called Maria, in 1947. They had four children.

As a young man, he saw Fritz Lang's film The Testament of Dr. Mabuse, which affected him greatly, making him interested in film. In September 1946, he founded the Central Cinema Company or CCC Films in the American sector of Berlin. He produced Sag' die Wahrheit, one of the first films produced in Germany after the war, followed by Morituri, which was a commercial failure and threw him into debt.  Brauner realised that to produce critically successful films he had to make up their losses by producing critically derided films that were appreciated by the public.  He lured back many Germans who had experience in Hollywood such as Robert Siodmak and later Fritz Lang who started a revival of Dr. Mabuse.

In 2009, Yad Vashem received a donation of 21 of Brauner's productions having to do with the Holocaust, including Die Weiße Rose, The Plot to Assassinate Hitler (Der 20. Juli) and Man and Beast (Mensch und Bestie). In 2010, Yad Vashem opened a media center in Brauner's name. Brauner called it the "crowning achievement of my film career".

Brauner was a prominent member of the Jewish community of Berlin and a recipient of the Bundesverdienstkreuz. At the 2003 Berlinale, he was awarded the Berlinale Kamera honouring his lifetime achievement. His many other awards included two Golden Globe Awards and an Academy Award for his co-production of the film The Garden of the Finzi-Continis by Vittorio De Sica. Brauner lived and worked in Berlin. He turned 100 in August 2018.

Brauner died on 7 July 2019 in Berlin.

Selected filmography
Brauner produced over 250 movies. Here a list of selected films produced by him:

Publications 
Mich gibt's nur einmal (autobiography). Munich, Berlin: Herbig (1976)

Awards 
1965: Goldene Leinwand for Old Shatterhand
1965: Goldene Leinwand for Der Schut
1967: Goldene Leinwand for Die Nibelungen
1970: Golden Bear for The Garden of the Finzi-Continis
1972: Academy Award for The Garden of the Finzi-Continis 
1983: Deutscher Filmpreis: Filmband in Silber for Die Weiße Rose
1990: Deutscher Filmpreis: Filmband in Gold for "long and outstanding work in German cinema" 
1992: Golden Globe for Europa Europa
1993: Bundesverdienstkreuz I. Klasse
2000: Goldene Kamera

References

External links

 Biography of Artur Brauner CCC Film. Retrieved 1 March 2012

Brauner at germanfilms.de
Biography and portrait 
 Ulrich Gutmair, Interview with Brauner die Tageszeitung (10 July 2008). Retrieved 1 March 2012 
Artur Brauner Archive at Deutsches Filminstitut, Frankfurt/Main
Artur Brauner Archive at European Film Gateway

1918 births
2019 deaths
German film producers
Polish emigrants to Germany
20th-century Polish Jews
Film people from Łódź
Officers Crosses of the Order of Merit of the Federal Republic of Germany
German centenarians
Men centenarians